Wollaton Road Methodist Church, Beeston was a Methodist church on Wollaton Road, Beeston, Nottinghamshire from 1853 until 2014.

History
The church was first located on Wollaton Road in 1853 when the congregation purchased a Particular Baptist Chapel on Wollaton Road, Beeston for £170. In 1857 the chapel was prospering enough for the congregation to purchase a new pipe organ from Kirkland and Jardine of Manchester which was opened on Whit Sunday of that year. 

The foundation stones of the current building were laid on 3 August 1882 and the building was significantly enlarged and a new schoolroom was also built attached to the chapel. This cost the sum of £1,200.

As of 2014, the church merged with the congregation at Chilwell Road Methodist Church and the former site at Queen's Road went up for sale in 2018.

References

Churches in Nottingham
Churches completed in 1882
Methodist churches in Nottinghamshire
Beeston, Nottinghamshire
1853 establishments in England